Schlatt is a village in the district of Breisgau-Hochschwarzwald in Baden-Württemberg. Since January 1973, it is an Ortsteil of Bad Krozingen.

Gallery

References 

Breisgau-Hochschwarzwald
Baden